Ahuzat Barak (lit. Barak Estate) is a community settlement in northern Israel. Located to the east of Afula, it falls under the jurisdiction of Jezreel Valley Regional Council.

History
The village was established in 1998 on private land, and was named after the biblical figure of Barak (Judges 4:6), who defeated the army of Jabin, king of Hazor, in the Jezreel Valley. It has absorbed several immigrants from South America.

References

External links
Village website 

Community settlements
Populated places established in 1998
Populated places in Northern District (Israel)
1998 establishments in Israel